The Forward, Russia! (Vperyod, Rossiya!) was an electoral bloc and political movement led by Boris Fyodorov during the 1995 State Duma election . It later merged into the Republican Party of Russia.

References

Defunct political parties in Russia
Liberal parties in Russia
People's Freedom Party